Sébastien Fournier (born 27 June 1971) is a Swiss football manager, most recently for FC Sion, and former football player.

Club career
Fournier played for FC Sion, VfB Stuttgart and Servette Geneva, where he spent most of his career.

He played for Switzerland national football team and was a participant at the 1994 FIFA World Cup and at the UEFA Euro 1996.

Managerial career

Servette
Fournier worked as a chief executive at Servette from 2006 to 2009. After this role, he was appointed as the new manager of the club's U21 squad. He got a double role in 2010, where he also was appointed as the headleader of the club's youth academy.

FC Sion
In June 2012, one week after his graduation from the UEFA Pro Licence, it was announced that Fournier would join FC Sion as manager in summer 2012. This marks the return to his childhood club and is linked with high expectations, even though it is his first station as a professional manager. He won the selection over Michel Decastel, because the club owner Christian Constantin wanted to have a young coach, after he was impressed with the achievements by Roberto Di Matteo, Pep Guardiola, André Villas-Boas and Murat Yakin. He was sacked as manager of Sion on 4 September 2012 due to a bad relationship between him and the squad.

Servette
On 13 September 2012, Fournier was appointed as the new manager of Servette. He got sacked after 11 months in the club on 20 August 2013.

FC Sion
In March 2014, Fournier got the role as technical director of the club. Later in 2014, Fournier was hired as U18 manager. So he had a double role. He was also appointed as caretaker for the U21 reserve team from September 2015 to the new year. And once again in April 2016.

On 25 April 2017, he was appointed as head coach of FC Sion after Peter Zeidler got sacked.

Honours

Player
FC Sion
Swiss Championship: 1991–92
Swiss Cup: 1994–95, 1995–96

Servette
Swiss Championship: 1998–99
Swiss Cup: 2000–01

References

1971 births
Living people
Association football midfielders
Swiss men's footballers
1994 FIFA World Cup players
UEFA Euro 1996 players
FC Sion players
VfB Stuttgart players
Servette FC players
Swiss Super League players
Bundesliga players
Expatriate footballers in Germany
Swiss expatriate sportspeople in Germany
Swiss expatriate footballers
Switzerland international footballers
Swiss-French people
Servette FC managers
Swiss football managers